Noftzger-Adams House is a historic home located at North Manchester, Wabash County, Indiana.  It was built in 1880, and is a two-story, brick dwelling with Second Empire and Gothic Revival style design elements. It sits on a stone block foundation and has a mansard roof with decorative brackets. It features a full-width front porch (reconstructed in 1978) and two-story bay.

It was listed on the National Register of Historic Places in 1979.

References

Houses on the National Register of Historic Places in Indiana
Gothic Revival architecture in Indiana
Second Empire architecture in Indiana
Houses completed in 1880
Buildings and structures in Wabash County, Indiana
National Register of Historic Places in Wabash County, Indiana